Low and Burbank's Grant is a township in Coös County, New Hampshire, United States. The grant lies entirely within the White Mountain National Forest. As of the 2020 census, the grant had a population of zero.

In New Hampshire, locations, grants, townships (which are different from towns), and purchases are unincorporated portions of a county which are not part of any town and have limited self-government (if any, as many are uninhabited).

History 
The purchase is named for Clovis Lowe of Jefferson and Barker Burbank of Shelburne who purchased land from the state in 1832.

Geography 

The grant is in the northern White Mountains, on the northern slopes of the Presidential Range and on the Dartmouth Range. The northern slopes of the range comprise one of the most densely tracked areas in the White Mountain National Forest. The Randolph Mountain Club and the Appalachian Mountain Club maintain seasonal huts and cabins on the north slopes of these two mountains, at or above .

Demographics 

As of the 2010 census, there were no people living in the grant.

References

Townships in Coös County, New Hampshire
Berlin, New Hampshire micropolitan area
Townships in New Hampshire